Gaelic Games Canada (GGC), or the Canadian GAA (CGAA), is responsible for Gaelic games across Canada, overseeing approximately 20 clubs. "GAA" is the abbreviation for the Gaelic Athletic Association.

It has the same status as one of the county boards of Ireland and is one of over thirty regional GAA executive boards throughout the world. The board is responsible for Gaelic football, hurling, camogie, rounders, gaelic handball, and ladies' Gaelic football teams in Canada.

The CGAA connects with three Gaelic games and cultural organizations: the Gaelic Athletic Association (GAA), the Ladies Gaelic Football Association (LGFA) & the Camogie Association (CA) whose headquarters are based in Dublin, Ireland. 

One of the more important tournaments for Gaelic football in Canada is the annual Western Canadian Championship. In North American competition, Canadian teams compete in the USGAA Finals, hosted by the United States GAA, an annual Gaelic Games championship between qualifying clubs in North America. The Gaelic games involved include hurling, camogie, and Gaelic football. Matches are held throughout the weekend of the tournament with the winning teams declared the USGAA champions in their respective divisions and sports. Internationally, Canada GAA has sent Canadian teams to the GAA World Games in 2016 and 2019.

History

Gaelic games have been played in Canada since before the foundation of the Gaelic Athletic Association in the 1880s, with some sources indicating that games of hurling were played in St. John's, Newfoundland in 1788.

Since the formation of the American County Board in the 1950s, Canadian teams have competed alongside teams from the United States. A separate and distinct Canadian County Board was founded in November 1987, and represented upwards of 20 clubs within Canada. The organization has since been renamed, "Gaelic Games Canada" (GGC).

In 2017, Jim Kelly, the Irish ambassador to Canada, was quoted as having said:

Organization

The Canadian County Board of the GAA has overall control of GAA activities in Canada and organized into three divisional boards. These boards, representing different areas of Canada, include the Toronto Board, Western Divisional Board and Eastern Canada GAA Board.

Toronto Division (TGAA)
Established in 1947, the Toronto (or Central) Board covers teams in the Greater Toronto Area. Today, the Toronto Gaelic Athletic Association (TGAA) divisional sub committee organizes Gaelic games clubs and competitions in the Toronto, Ottawa and Montreal areas. As of mid-2020 this included 6 Men's Gaelic football teams, 5 Ladies Gaelic football teams, 2 hurling teams, 2 camogie teams and 3 minor programs.

Western Division (WCGAA)
Founded in May 2003, the Western Canada Gaelic Athletic Association (WCGAA), or Western Division, covers Gaelic Athletics Activities in British Columbia, Alberta, Saskatchewan, and Manitoba.

Many of the clubs in the division have field both men's and ladies' teams. Other clubs are also invited to attend tournaments, even though they are not affiliated with the division, (e.g. Lethbridge Laochra, Seattle Gaels, Fort McMurray, Vancouver Irish, etc), or not affiliated with the GAA (e.g. Vancouver Cougars, Calgary Kangaroos, and Calgary Kookaburras Australian rules football teams).

The main competition in the Western Division is the Western Canadian Championship. Teams also play in local competitions, including the Alberta Cup, which serves as a feeder to the Championship, and is hosted by the individual teams themselves.

Eastern Division (ECGAA)
The Eastern Division Gaelic Athletic Association (ECGAA) divisional sub committee, or Eastern Division, was established in 2014, and covers eastern Ontario, Quebec, Nova Scotia, and Prince Edward Island.

The primary competition of the Eastern Division is the Eastern Canadian Championships. This competition was first established in 2014, and held in Newfoundland. In 2017, youth games were included at the Championships held in Ottawa.

Clubs

There are clubs in every province of Canada with the exception of 
New Brunswick, the Northwest Territories, Nunavut, and the Yukon.

The following are the GAA clubs of the Canadian Gaelic Athletic Association, (CGAA):

Eastern GAA
 GFC = Gaelic Football Club
 GAA = Gaelic Athletic Association

Toronto GAA (Central Canada)
 GFC = Gaelic Football Club
 GAA = Gaelic Athletic Association

Western Canada GAA
 GFC = Gaelic Football Club
 GAA = Gaelic Athletic Association
 ISSC = Vancouver Irish Sporting and Social Club

Tournaments

Canadian tournaments

Canadians who participation in Gaelic Games have a number of opportunities to compete at the local, provincial, and inter-provincial level, within Canadian borders.

These include the Western Canadian Championship, which is a tournament for Canadian Gaelic football teams.

North American tournaments

In North American competition, Canadian teams compete in the USGAA North American Championships, hosted in America by the United States Gaelic Athletic Association (USGAA).

International tournaments

GAA World Games

Canada GAA has sent Canadian teams to the GAA World Championships in the past, including the 2016 Etihad Airways GAA World Games. For the 2019 Renault GAA World Games, thirty-four Montreal Shamrocks were selected to represent Canada. This competition was hosted in Ireland in July 2019. It was the largest delegate from 1 club in Canada. This included the following:
 Men's Gaelic football - 5 players
 Women's Gaelic football - 13 players
 Hurling - 6 players
 Camogie - 10 players

References

External links
 

 
 
Sports organizations established in 1987
Gaelic games clubs in Canada
Irish-Canadian culture